The Michigan Wolverines men's gymnastics team represents the University of Michigan and competes in the Big Ten Conference. The Wolverines have won seven NCAA championships, 18 Big Ten championships and have been invited to 31 NCAA tournaments.  Since 1999, Michigan has finished in the Super Six at the NCAA tournament in 11 of 12 seasons.  In 2013, Michigan won its fifth NCAA men's gymnastics team championship.  The following year, Michigan repeated as National Champions for its sixth NCAA men's gymnastics team championship.

History
The Michigan Wolverines men's gymnastics team has had five coaches in 65 years of competition: Wilbur West (1931–1933); Newt Loken (1948–1983); Bob Darden (1984–1996); and Kurt Golder (1997–2022), Yuan Xiao (2022–present).

West era (1931–1933)
Wilbur West was Michigan's first men's gymnastics coach.  In three years under West, the team compiled a record of 1–10.  After the 1933 season, the gymnastics program was discontinued and was not resumed until 1948.

Loken era (1948–1983)
Newt Loken came to the University of Michigan in 1944 as a master's degree student. On the side, he coached the cheerleading team. At the time of Loken's arrival, Michigan did not have a men's gymnastics program. In 1947, the athletic board awarded varsity status to men's gymnastics, and Loken was named the head coach.

Loken remained the coach of Michigan's men's gymnastics team for 36 years and compiled a record of 250–72–1. His teams won NCAA men's gymnastics championships in 1963 and 1970 and 12 Big Ten championships. Loken coached 71 Big Ten individual event winners and 21 NCAA individual event winners.

In 1963, the Wolverines compiled a 6–0 in the regular season and won the Big Ten championship with 210.50 points.  They went on to win the NCAA championship with a score of 129 points.  The 1963 team also won six NCAA individual championships.

In 1970, the team compiled a perfect 12–0 record and won its second team championship with 164.150 points in the NCAA tournament.

Loken also coached the cheerleading team at Michigan as well as the varsity sport of trampoline. From 1947 through 1964, trampoline was included as an event in gymnastics competitions by both the AAU and NCAA. The first trampoline world championships were held in 1964. Loken led the Michigan trampoline team to NCAA championships in 1969 and 1970. Loken produced more trampoline champions and world medal winners than any other collegiate coach.

As of 2007, the 88-year-old Loken was still a regular at Michigan's men's gymnastics practices and events, and it was reported that he had not missed a Michigan home meet from 1948 to 2007. Assistant coach Scott Vetere said: "He knows everybody on the team, and if he forgets, he's 80-some years old, and he'll ask again. He's just a pure gymnastics guy – always wants to be around gymnastics, always wants to learn more, (always) wants to praise guys for what a wonderful job they're doing."

Darden era (1984–1996)

Bob Darden (1984–1996) was head coach for 13 seasons.  During Darden's tenure as head coach, the Wolverines compiled a record of 76–111–1 and had no Big Ten championships or NCAA tournament berths.

Golder era (1997–2021)
Kurt Golder took over as Michigan's head coach in 1997.  After Michigan finished the 1996 season with an 0–11 record, Golder quickly turned the program around.  In 14 seasons from 1997–2010, Golder has led the Wolverines to a record of 246–166–1, four Big Ten championships, 10 NCAA tournament berths and two NCAA national championships.  Since 1999, Golder's teams have finished in the Super Six at the NCAA tournament in 10 of 11 years.

In 1999, Kurt Golder led the Wolverines to a 19–5 record in the regular season.  The 1999 team went on to win the school's third team gymnastics championship with season-best 232.55 points in the NCAA tournament. The runner up was Ohio State, which finished with 230.85 points. Justin Toman was Michigan's leader at the 1999 tournament with a score of 58.075.  The NCAA championship came just three years after a winless season in 1996.  Golder was credited with taking over the program and building it into "a national powerhouse."  Upon winning the 1999 NCAA championship, Golder told the press, "The plan was to get here in the fourth year and be in contention in the fifth year.  We got lucky and got some great recruits. Everything fell into place."

The 2009 Wolverines finished #2 as the runner-up at the NCAA tournament.  Michigan gymnast Thomas Kelley was named Big Ten Gymnast of the Year in 2009.

The 2010 Wolverines won the NCAA men's gymnastics national championship, defeating the second place team from Stanford University by 0.7 points.  Michigan gymnast Chris Cameron also won the all-around title with 90.500 points, including 15.450 on the rings and vaulting, 15.150 on parallel bars, 15.050 on pommel horse, and 13.800 on the horizontal bar.

The 2011 Wolverines finished second in the Big Ten and fifth at the NCAA men's gymnastics championship. The highlight of this season was freshman Sam Mikulak who won both the Big Ten and NCAA all-around titles. Sam was the first freshman in NCAA history to win the all-around title.

The 2013 Wolverines won their 16th Big Ten Championship behind an NCAA record-setting 15.95 performance on parallel bars from junior Sam Mikulak and a 1–2 all-around competition finish from Mikulak and sophomore Adrian de los Angeles. On April 20, 2013, behind Sam Mikulak's second career NCAA all-around crown and a runner-up performance from Adrian de los Angeles, the team claimed the program's fifth national title.

The 2014 Wolverines captured their 17th Big Ten Championship to become the first back-to-back conference champions since the 1999–2000 team.  Senior Sam Mikulak broke two NCAA records with a 93.70 all around score and a 16.1 parallel bar score.  Twenty of the thirty competed routines qualified into the individual event finals the following day, a record breaking number. Gymnasts that qualified included: Syque Caesar (vault, parallel bars, high bar), Sam Mikulak (all six events), Paul Rizkalla Jr. (vault), Tristian Perez-Rivera (vault, floor), Konner Ackerman (vault), Jordan Gaarenstroom (parallel bars, still rings), Nicholas Hunter (parallel bars, pommel horse), Colin Mahar (still rings), Alex Bubnov (still rings), Nolan Novak (pommel horse) and Matt Freeman (pommel horse).  Freshman Tristian Perez-Rivera and Junior Paul Rizkalla Jr. placed second on floor and vault respectively while senior Sam Mikulak and sixth year senior Syque Caesar tied for third place on parallel bars.

The 2021 Wolverines captured their 18th Big Ten Championship. Michigan won the meet by 13 points, the largest margin of victory in the championship since 1977. Senior Cameron Bock tied for the all-around title and won pommel horse and still rings.  Sophomore Paul Juda took third in the all-around and placed second on parallel bars and high bar. On November 29, 2021, Golder announced his retirement after 25 seasons with the Wolverines. He  led the Wolverines to four NCAA championships (1999, 2010, 2013, 2014) and six Big Ten Conference titles.

Xiao era (2022–present)
The 2022 Wolverines captured their 19th Big Ten Championship. Junior Paul Juda won the all-around competition with a cumulative score of 85.350, while teammate Jacob Moore took third.

On April 25, 2022, Xiao was promoted to head coach, agreeing to a five-year contract through the 2027 season.

Coaches

Rosters

2023 Roster

Conference awards
Big Ten Gymnast of the Year
2000: Scott Vetere
2005: Justin Laury
2009: Thomas Kelley
2010: Chris Cameron
2011: Sam Mikulak
2013: Sam Mikulak
2014: Sam Mikulak
2021: Paul Juda
2022: Paul Juda

Big Ten Freshman of the Year
1989: Louie Ball
1998: Kevin Roulston
1999: Scott Vetere
2003: Justin Laury
2008: Thomas Kelley
2011: Sam Mikulak
2020: Paul Juda

Big Ten Coach of the Year
1999: Kurt Golder
2000: Kurt Golder
2013: Kurt Golder
2014: Kurt Golder
2020: Kurt Golder
2022: Xiao Yuan

NCAA individual event champions
Michigan has had 19 gymnasts who have won NCAA individual championships.

1949: Edsel Buchanan – trampoline
1950: Edsel Buchanan – trampoline
1951: Edsel Buchanan – trampoline
1959: Ed Cole – trampoline
1963: Gary Erwin – trampoline
1963: Mike Henderson – floor exercise
1963: Gil LaRose – vault, horizontal bar, all-around
1963: Arno Lascari – parallel bars
1964: Gary Erwin – trampoline
1966: Wayne Miller – trampoline
1967: Dave Jacobs – floor exercise, trampoline

1968: George Huntzicker – trampoline
1969: Dave Jacobs – trampoline
1969: Ron Rapper – parallel bars
1970: George Huntzicker – trampoline
1970: Ron Rapper – parallel bars
1978: John Corritore – parallel bars
1992: Brian Winkler – floor exercise
1999: Justin Toman – parallel bars
2000: Justin Toman – parallel bars
2000: Kris Zimmerman – parallel bars
2002: Daniel Diaz-Luong – horizontal bar

2003: Andrew DiGiore – vault
2010: Ryan McCarthy – horizontal bar
2010: Chris Cameron – all-around
2011: Sam Mikulak – all-around
2013: Sam Mikulak – all-around, parallel bar, high bar
2014: Sam Mikulak – all-around
2016: Anthony McCallum - vault
2017: Anthony McCallum - vault
2019: Anthony McCallum - vault
2022: Paul Juda – all-around, vault

National Team Members
Michigan has had 19 gymnasts who have been a part of the USA National Team.

Justin Toman: 1998–2003
Scott Vetere: 1999–2000
Daniel Diaz-Luong: 2001
Kris Zimmerman: 2001
Chris Cameron: 2009–2011
Sam Mikulak: 2011–2021
Adrian de los Angeles: 2012
Stacey Ervin: 2013–2014
Cameron Bock: 2018–2022
Paul Juda: 2020–present

Past Olympians
 Syque Caesar  (2012)
 Sam Mikulak (2012, 2016, 2020)
 Uche Eke  (2020)
 Cameron Bock (2020 alternate)

References

External links